Jonathan Kimberley (7 June 1651 – 7 March 1720) was Dean of Lichfield from 1713 until his death.

Born in Bromsgrove, Smallwood was educated at Pembroke College, Oxford. He migrated to Cambridge in 1776. He held livings at Stadhampton, Coventry, Baginton, Leamington Hastings and Tatenhill.

Kimberley was appointed Chaplain to the Speaker of the House of Commons by Speaker William Bromley in 1710, and then Dean of Lichfield in 1713.

He died in Tatenhill in 1720.

References

Alumni of Pembroke College, Oxford
People from Bromsgrove
17th-century English Anglican priests
18th-century English Anglican priests
Deans of Lichfield
1651 births
1720 deaths
Chaplains of the House of Commons (UK)
Canons of Westminster